DYLS-TV (channel 27) is a television station in Metro Cebu, Philippines, serving as the Visayas flagship of the GTV network. It is owned and operated by GMA Network, Inc. alongside GMA outlet DYSS-TV (channel 7). The station maintains an analog transmitter located at the GMA Skyview Complex, Nivel Hills, Apas, Cebu City and a digital transmitter located atop Mount Busay, Brgy. Bonbon.

History
DYLS-TV signed on the air in 1995 as Citynet Television 27 (or just Citynet 27). It was programmed like an independent stationGMA intended Citynet 27 to be its main outlet for imported programming (particularly from the United States), which freed up slots in GMA Network's schedule for more domestic productions. However, by 1999, the station turned into a music channel as EMC, the Entertainment Music Channelwhich was also the country's first locally operated music channel. A few months later, GMA reached a deal with Asian broadcaster STAR TV to allow this station to be a carrier of Channel V Philippines, which took effective December 19, 1999. However, the station closed down on July 25, 2001 due to financial problems.

On November 11, 2005, after four years of being dark, the station returned its operations as an all-female lifestyle channel QTV (Quality TeleVision later renamed as simply Q in March 2007), with its flagship station in Metro Manila was DZOE-TVwhich GMA ran as part of a lease with its owner, ZOE Broadcasting Network (who also aired programming on Q's schedule as part of the agreement, which also granted it access to technical resources from GMA). This would feature a lineup predominantly aimed towards of women, with a mixture of domestic and imported lifestyle programs and dramatic series. GMA Network announced that it would replace Q with the news channel GMA News TV, which was unveiled on February 7, 2011. As Q's programming ended on February 20, the network, broadcasting transitional branding Channel 11 (along with other stations nationwide), continued to air teasers for the impending re-launch from February 21–25, and signed off completely on the 26th and 27th of the same month in preparation for the launch of the new service. On February 28, 2011, DYLS-TV and other GMA's sister UHF stations nationwide were reformatted and formal re-launch as news and public affairs channel GMA News TV, and as part of GMA News and Public Affairs's plans to expand its presence on free-to-air television.

On February 9, 2021, GMA Network announced that GMA News TV will officially rebrand to GTV on February 22, 2021 as the new news, entertainment and sports channel (similarly to its old Citynet & Q format in 1995).

Digital television

Digital channels

DYLS-TV's feed is broadcast on DYSS-TV digital subchannel operates on UHF channel 26 (545.143 MHz) and broadcasts on the following subchannels:

See also
GTV
GMA News TV (the former name of GTV)
DYSS-TV
DYRT
DYSS
List of GTV stations
Q (the former name of GMA News TV)
DWDB-TV
DXRA-TV

Television stations in Cebu City
Television channels and stations established in 1995
GTV (Philippine TV network) stations